Ralph Lazo (November 3, 1924 – January 1, 1992) was the only known non-spouse, non-Japanese American who voluntarily relocated to a World War II Japanese American internment camp. His experience was the subject of the 2004 narrative short film Stand Up for Justice: The Ralph Lazo Story.

Biography
Ralph Lazo, born in Los Angeles on November 3, 1924, was of Mexican-American and Irish American descent. His mother died when he and his sister were young, leaving them in the care of their father, who found work painting houses and murals.

As a Belmont High School student at age 17, Lazo learned that his Japanese American friends and neighbors were being forcibly removed as part of the Japanese American Internment and incarcerated at Manzanar. Lazo was so outraged that he joined friends on a train that took hundreds to Manzanar in May 1942. Manzanar officials never asked him about his ancestry.

"Internment was immoral", Lazo told the Los Angeles Times. "It was wrong, and I couldn't accept it." "These people hadn't done anything that I hadn't done except to go to Japanese language school."

Lazo attended school at the camp, and also spent time entertaining orphaned children who had been forcibly relocated to Manzanar. In 1944, Lazo was elected president of his class at Manzanar High School. After his graduation, he remained at the camp until August 1944, when he was inducted into the US Army. He served as a Staff Sergeant in the South Pacific until 1946, helping liberate the Philippines. Lazo was awarded the Bronze Star for heroism in combat. The film Stand Up for Justice: The Ralph Lazo Story documents his life story, particularly his stand against the incarceration.

After the war, Lazo returned to Los Angeles, where he graduated from UCLA with a degree in sociology and earned a master's degree in education from Cal State Northridge. Lazo spent his career teaching, mentoring disabled students and encouraging Hispanics to attend college and vote. Lazo also helped raise funds for a class-action lawsuit to win reparations for Japanese Americans interned during the war, which resulted in the Civil Liberties Act of 1988. This act offered an apology to interned Japanese Americans on behalf of the U.S. government and stated that the internment was based on "race prejudice, war hysteria, and a failure of political leadership."

Lazo died in 1992 from liver cancer, at the age of 67.

References

1924 births
1992 deaths
American civil rights activists
American people of Irish descent
American people of Mexican descent
Belmont High School (Los Angeles) alumni
California State University, Northridge alumni
Deaths from liver cancer
Internment of Japanese Americans
People from Los Angeles
People interned during World War II
University of California, Los Angeles alumni
Deaths from cancer in California
United States Army personnel of World War II
United States Army non-commissioned officers